Gabexate is a serine protease inhibitor which is used therapeutically (as gabexate mesilate) in the treatment of pancreatitis, disseminated intravascular coagulation, and as a regional anticoagulant for haemodialysis.

References 

Guanidines
Benzoate esters
Ethyl esters